Alples is the leading middle price furniture manufacturer in Slovenia. It was established in 1955 as Medzadružno lesno industrijsko podjetje Češnjica ("The intercooperative timber industry company Češnjica") in 1955 and renamed to its current name in 1969. Its headquarters are located in Železniki. It has 330 employees and a revenue of 30 million euros. The factory’s main production program is furniture made of chipboard, covered with melamine foil.

Alples produces furniture for bedrooms, living rooms, dining rooms, youth rooms and anterooms, a special line of cabinets for audio-video equipment and coffee tables. 50% of the products are exported, the rest are sold in domestic market. Main export markets are the United States, Austria, Croatia, Hungary, Russia, Slovakia, Czech Republic, Japan, and Macedonia.

External links
 Alples homepage

Furniture companies of Slovenia
Slovenian brands
Manufacturing companies established in 1955
Municipality of Železniki
1955 establishments in Slovenia